Ada of Caria (fl. 377 – 326 BC) was a member of the House of Hecatomnus (the Hecatomnids) and ruler of Caria during the mid-4th century BC, first as Persian Satrap and later as Queen under the auspices of Alexander III (the Great) of Macedon.

History
Ada was the daughter of Hecatomnus, satrap of Caria, sister of Mausolus, Pixodarus, Artemisia, and Idrieus. Four of the siblings intermarried: Mausolus wed Artemisia, while Ada was married to her brother Idrieus. Pixodarus married outside of the family. Every child of Hecatomnus would govern over Caria at some point.  Mausolus and Artemisia first ruled together, and after Mausolus' death, Artemisia ruled alone until she died in 344 BC.

Idrieus and Ada ruled together for four years, until his death. During their rule, they kept close ties to the Hellenic world. The joint regents were mentioned as donors to the Temple of Athena in Tegea, and seem to have also been major patrons of Delphi. After the death of her husband, Ada became the sole satrap of Caria, but was expelled by her brother Pixodarus in 340 BC. Upon his death in 335 BC, was succeeded by his own son-in-law, the Persian Orontobates. Ada fled to the fortress of Alinda, where she maintained her rule in exile.

When Alexander the Great entered Caria in 334 BC, Ada adopted Alexander as her son and surrendered Alinda to him. Alexander accepted her offer and, in return, gave Ada formal command of the Siege of Halicarnassus. After the fall of Halicarnassus, Alexander returned Alinda to Ada and made her queen of all of Caria. Ada's popularity with the populace in turn ensured the Carians' loyalty to Alexander. 

She was under the protection of Asander, Hellenistic satrap of Lydia.

Ada sarcophagus
According to Turkish archaeologists, the tomb of Ada has been discovered, although this claim remains unresolved. Her remains are on display in the archaeological museum of Bodrum.

Notes

References
E.D. Carney, "Women and Dunasteia in Caria", American Journal of Philology 126 (2005), pp. 65–91.
W. Heckel, Who’s Who in the Age of Alexander the Great, Oxford (Blackwell), 2006, p. 3
Attilio Mastrocinque, La Caria e la Ionia meridionale in epoca ellenistica, 323-188 a. C. (Rome, 1979)
Stephen Ruzicka, Politics of a Persian dynasty : the Hecatomnids in the fourth century B.C. (1992)
Simon Hornblower, Mausolus (1982)
 
Livius, Ada  by Jona Lendering
Ada from Smith, Dictionary of Greek and Roman Biography and Mythology (1867)
Photos of Halicarnassus Includes a picture of the skeleton of Ada.
 

Carian people
People from Muğla
Achaemenid satraps of Caria
Satraps of the Alexandrian Empire
4th-century BC women rulers
Hecatomnid dynasty